Peer-to-peer banking is a term used in the blockchain banking industry and designates an act of transfer of value without the need of an intermediary such as a bank.

Peer-to-peer banking is an online system that allows individual members to complete financial transactions with one another by using an auction style process that lets members offer loans for a specific amount and at a specific rate.

Definition in the traditional banking 
Buyers have the option to look for an amount and rate of interest that meets their needs. All members are categorized by their risk level. Members can browse for other people based on various demographic information.

Since P2P banking does not use third party banking institution intermediaries the rates and terms are often much more favourable for the members.

Unlike conventional banking where the spread between deposit rates and lending rates are consumed to finance the bank's administrative and logistic expenses, both lenders and borrowers get to save such costs, while paying certain commission to the P2P portal provider and/or the credit rating agency.

P2P banking and financing has been proposed as a method to accelerate the development renewable energy projects while more equitably distributing the return on investment. These concepts have now been instituted by Energy in Common and Kiva in their green fund.

Old models 
The following two pictures show the difference between the peer to peer banking approach and the normal way with a financial institute.

See also 
 LendingClub
 Peer-to-peer
 Social peer-to-peer processes
 Peer-to-peer lending

References 

Banking
Peer-to-peer